Patria (pronounced PAY-tree-uh, as in patriot) is a 1917 15-chapter American serial film starring Irene Castle, Milton Sills, and Warner Oland, based on the novel The Last of the Fighting Channings by Louis Joseph Vance. Patria was an independent film serial funded by William Randolph Hearst in the lead-up to the United States' entry into World War I. The film in its original form contained anti-Japanese propaganda and was investigated by a Senate committee. The Argentine title for the film was La Heroina de Nueva York.

Plot
Spies from Japan conspire to steal the Channing "preparedness" fortune and invade the United States, beginning in New York, then allying themselves with Mexicans across the border. They are stopped by the efforts of munitions factory heiress Patria Channing and U.S. Secret Service agent Donald Parr.

Cast
 Irene Castle as Patria Channing, the heroine of the serial (billed as "Mrs Vernon Castle"), and a lookalike dancer in Episode 4 named Elaine
 Milton Sills as Captain Donald Parr 
 Warner Oland as Baron , the villain
 Dorothy Green as Fanny Adair 
 George Majeroni as Senor Juan de Lima 
 Wallace Beery as Pancho Villa
 M.W. Rale as 
 Allan Murnane as Rodney Wrenn 
 F.W. Stewart as Edouard
 Leroy Baker
 Floyd Buckley
 Nigel Barrie
 Charles Brinley
 George Lessey
 Rudolph Valentino

Production
Patria was financed with "about" $90,000 from William Randolph Hearst. The plot implied that the United States might soon be at war with Japan, despite Japan being an ally of the United States at the time. The original plot involved a Japanese spy ring operating in the United States and seeking gold and munitions. President Woodrow Wilson asked Hearst to modify the serial and remove anti-Japanese material. As a result, Warner Oland's character name in title cards was changed to "Manuel Morales," and the character was shown more frequently dressed in a suit, though the Japanese characters retained their kimono in early episodes. The action was also moved across the border to Mexico beginning in Episode 11, though as is sometimes erroneously stated, Pancho Villa did not appear in the film, Baron  and a new character, General , continued on as adversaries to Patria and Captain Parr until 's defeat and suicide in Episode 15.

The serial was based on the novel The Last of the Fighting Channings by Louis Joseph Vance. Jacques Jaccard directed scenes in California while Leopold Wharton and Theodore Wharton directed from Ithaca, New York. Following the serial's release, Edgar Wallace was commissioned to write a 15-part "novel" for The News of the World newspaper, which published the first weekly instalment on 9 December 1917.

Senate hearing
The production was investigated by a Senate committee as German propaganda after World War I. A German propagandist, whose articles had appeared in Hearst newspapers, had written a letter to Franz von Papen explaining the scheme to use a motion picture to deprecate Japan. Captain G. C. Lester of US Military Intelligence, testified that "Patria exploited the very idea which was set forth generally in (the propagandist) Fox's statement."

See also
 Zimmermann Telegram, a German plot for the Mexican invasion of the United States
 List of film serials
 List of film serials by studio

References

External links

 
 
 Patria at Cinefania Online
 Museum of Modern Art photograph from Patria

1917 films
1917 drama films
American black-and-white films
Silent American drama films
American independent films
American silent serial films
American World War I propaganda films
1910s English-language films
Films about the United States Coast Guard
Films directed by Jacques Jaccard
Films directed by Leopold Wharton
Films directed by Theodore Wharton
Pathé Exchange films
1910s independent films
1910s American films
Silent adventure films
Silent war films